The district of Maskinongé was established in 1853, under the Union regime of 1841. It was located in the current Mauricie area and was located southwest of the district of Saint-Maurice on the north shore of the St. Lawrence River.

Champlain was represented by one Member at the Legislative Assembly of the Province of Canada.

Members for Maskinongé (1854-1867)

{| border="1" cellpadding="5" cellspacing="0" style="border-collapse: collapse border-color: #444444"
|- bgcolor="darkgray"
| 
|Name
|Party
|Election 

|Joseph-Édouard TurcotteParti bleu1854

|Louis-Honoré GauvreauParti bleu1858

|George CaronParti bleu1858

|George CaronParti bleu1861

|Moïse HoudeParti rouge1863
|}

Footnotes

See also
History of Canada
History of Quebec
Louiseville
Maskinongé Electoral District
Maskinongé Provincial Electoral District
Politics of Canada
Politics of Quebec

Electoral districts of Canada East